The 2015 Bayern Rundfahrt was the 36th edition of the Bayern Rundfahrt, an annual cycling road race. It was held between 13 and 17 May, starting in Regensburg and ending in Nürnberg. The race consisted of five stages, the fourth being an individual time trial.

Schedule

Teams
19 teams were selected to take place in the 2015 Bayern–Rundfahrt. Five of these were UCI WorldTeams, eight were UCI Professional Continental teams and six were UCI Continental teams.

Stages

Stage 1
13 May 2015 — Regensburg to Waldsassen,

Stage 2
14 May 2015 — Waldsassen to Selb,

Stage 3
15 May 2015 — Selb to Ebern,

Stage 4
16 May 2015 — Haßfurt to Haßfurt, individual time trial (ITT)

Stage 5
17 May 2015 — Haßfurt to Nürnberg,

Classification leadership table

Final standings

General classification

Points classification

Mountains classification

Young rider classification

Teams classification

References

External links

Bayern-Rundfahrt
Bayern-Rundfahrt
Bayern-Rundfahrt